Pebble to a Pearl is the fourth album by the American funk/soul singer Nikka Costa. The album was produced by Costa's husband Justin Stanley, who also worked with Jamie Lidell and Beck.  It was released independently on Costa and Stanley's label Go Funk Yourself Records, and distributed by the then recently re-activated Stax Records.

Track listing

European bonus tracks

13. "The Denial Twist"

LP edition bonus tracks

13. "Stuck To You" (Instrumental)
14. "Pebble to a Pearl" (Instrumental)
15. " !@#$%^&*, I said it first" (Instrumental)

Leftover tracks
 "Maybe Baby" - released as a digital single only. It was canceled from the album because of differences in the style
 "Negative People" - written for in 2007, but it was pulled back in the last second. Live version of the song leaked
 "The Denial Twist" - a cover of The White Stripes song, presented on Nikka's MySpace in 2007

Singles
 "Maybe Baby" 
 "Stuck to You" - the first single from the album available as digital download
 "Pebble to a Pearl" - promo only [1]

Production
Producer: Justin Stanley
Co-Producer: Nikka Costa
Executive producer: Andre Recke
Mixing: Russel Elevado
Mastering: Dave Collins
Design: Hans Hettich
Cover art concept: Nikka Costa

External links
 Information about the album and song previews
 Power of Soul article
 Billboard review of Pebble to a Pearl

2008 albums
Nikka Costa albums
Albums produced by Justin Stanley